This is a list of electoral results for the Electoral division of Namatjira in Northern Territory elections.

Election results

Elections in the 2010s

Elections in the 2020s

References

Northern Territory electoral results by district